Fatoumata Bagayoko (born May 23, 1988) is a Malian women's basketball player. Bagayoko competed for Mali at the 2008 Summer Olympics, where she scored 21 in 5 games, including 8 points in the final loss to Spain. She was born in Bamako and plays for Djoliba AC women's basketball team.

References

1988 births
Living people
Malian women's basketball players
Olympic basketball players of Mali
Basketball players at the 2008 Summer Olympics
Sportspeople from Bamako
African Games gold medalists for Mali
African Games medalists in basketball
Guards (basketball)
Competitors at the 2015 African Games
21st-century Malian people